The following is a list of events affecting Philippine television in 1985. Events listed include television show debuts, finales, cancellations, and channel launches, closures and rebrandings, as well as information about controversies and carriage disputes.

Premieres

Unknown
 Gabi ng Lagim on GMA
 Kumander Toothpick on GMA
 True Confessions ng mga Bituin on GMA
 Regal Shockers on GMA
 Late Night with June & Johnny on GMA
 Not So Late Night with Edu on GMA
 Pass the Mike with JQ and Willie on GMA
 Ecotrends on GMA
 Saturday Matinee on GMA
 Sining Siete on GMA
 Movies to Watch on GMA
 Highway to Heaven on GMA
 227 on GMA

Returning or renamed programs

Finales
 May 10: Anna Liza on GMA
 August 2: Yagit on GMA

Unknown
 Gulong ng Palad on City 2 Television
 Champoy on RPN
 Mga Alagad ni Kalantiao on GMA
 Real People on GMA
 Sine Siyete on GMA
 Little House on the Prairie on GMA
 Three's Company on GMA
 NFL on GMA on GMA

Births
 January 14 – Jason Abalos, television actor
January 16 – Stefano Mori Filipino actor and singer
 January 20 – Roxanne Barcelo, Filipino-American singer and actress
 February 14 – Heart Evangelista, Chinese-Filipino singer, actress and TV show host
 February 17 – Anne Curtis, actress, singer, model and TV show host
 March 10 – Christian Esteban, broadcaster, TV personality
 April 7 – KC Concepcion, singer and actress; currently the Philippines Goodwill Ambassador against hunger of the UN's World Food Programme
 April 16 – JC Tiuseco, Chinese Filipino actor, basketball player, TV show host and model
 April 23 – Angel Locsin, actress and commercial model
 June 6 – Victor Basa, actor
 June 20 – Camille Prats, actress
 June 23 – Laarni Lozada, singer
 June 25 – Ehra Madrigal, actress
 July 12 – Marco Alcaraz, actor, model, basketball player
 July 15 – Chris Tiu, professional basketball player, TV show host and commercial model
 August 15 – Cogie Domingo, actor
 September 3 – Carlo Aquino, actor and singer
 September 5 – John Medina, actor
 September 7 – Neri Naig, actress
 September 21 – Michelle Ayalde, singer and TV Host
 October 21 – Rainier Castillo, actor and dancer
 November 5 – Patricia Fernandez, actress

Deaths
 May 6 – Julie Vega, child actress and singer (b. 1968)

See also
1985 in television

References

Philippine television-related lists
Television in the Philippines by year
1985 in Philippine television